The Barril Viejo Formation is a geologic formation in Mexico. It preserves fossils dating back to the Cretaceous period.

See also 

 List of fossiliferous stratigraphic units in Mexico

External links 
 

Geologic formations of Mexico
Cretaceous Mexico